The Bersey Electric Cab (also known as the London Electrical Cab) was an early electric-powered vehicle and the first electric taxi cab in London. An initial service of 12 cabs began on 19 August 1897 and a total of 77 were built, with a maximum of 75 in service at once. They were initially popular and were nicknamed "hummingbirds" for the sound they made and their distinctive livery. The vehicles suffered badly from wear in service owing to their heavy weight. This damaged the batteries and tyres, which were expensive to replace, and made their operation unprofitable. The cabs were withdrawn in August 1899 and electric cabs did not return to the streets of London until the Nissan Dynamo was introduced in October 2019.

Design 
The Bersey cab was designed by Walter Bersey, an electrical engineer who had earlier constructed an electric powered bus and van as well as private cars.  The cab was driven by a Johnson-Lundell electric motor described variously as 3.5 or 8 horsepower or 2.2 kilowatts.  Power was supplied by a bank of 40 grid-plate traction batteries with a total capacity of 170 ampere hours (assuming a 30 ampere demand).  The batteries weighed 14 hundredweight and, being delicate, were hung underneath the chassis on springs.  Before going into service the batteries went through testing on Bersey's "shaking machine" to ensure they would stand up to the rigours of use.

Speed was controlled by means of a lever that provided three options: , though a top speed of up to  has been reported. Braking was by means of a foot pedal that disconnected the electrical drive circuit.

The first cabs were constructed by the Great Horseless Carriage Company, with bodies made by the coachbuilder Mulliner and designed to resemble a traditional horse-drawn coupé cab.  Internal and external electric lighting was provided.  The vehicle's four wheels were clad with solid rubber tyres that were intended to provide grip on London's greasy pavements.  A later version of the cab with larger capacity batteries was built by the Gloucester Railway Waggon Company.  A total of 77 cabs of both types were constructed.  Bersey said the advantages of his invention were that "there is no smell, no noise, no heat, no vibration, no possible danger, and it has been found that vehicles built on this company's system do not frighten passing horses".

In service 
The Bersey cab was first exhibited at a motor show in South Kensington in 1896.  An example was entered into the 14 November 1896 London to Brighton emancipation race which was a celebration of the passing of the Locomotives on Highways Act 1896 which relaxed regulations and speed limits for road vehicles.  The Bersey cab's range was insufficient to complete the entire  route so it was partly transported by train.

The London Electrical Cab Company ran a service of 12 Bersey cabs in central London from 19 August 1897 after an inauguration presided over by eminent electrical engineer William Henry Preece.  They became the first self-propelled taxis in the city.  As part of their licensing conditions the Metropolitan Police had required them to meet four conditions: That they be driven only by professional drivers; that they could stop on demand; that they could turn around in a small radius and that they were capable of climbing Savoy Hill, which was the steepest in the city.

The cabs charged the same rates as those used by horse-drawn cabs and were initially quite popular; even the Prince of Wales (the future King Edward VII) travelled in one.  The cabs quickly became known as "hummingbirds" for the noise made by their motors and their distinctive black and yellow livery.  Passengers reported that the interior fittings were luxurious when compared to horse-drawn cabs but there were some complaints that the internal lighting made them too conspicuous to those outside the cab.

The fleet peaked at around 75 cabs, all of which needed to return to the single depot at Lambeth to switch batteries.  This was achieved by means of hydraulic lifts that could complete the operation in 2–3 minutes.  The London Electrical Cab Company planned to introduce additional battery charging and exchange depots in the future to expand its coverage and range.  Owing to the expense of electricity available at the time the company invested in its own electricity generators.

Fate 
The tyres of the cabs suffered due to the heavy weight of the vehicle.  After six months of operation they tended to be badly worn which led to increased vibration.  The vibration had a bad effect on the delicate glass plates in the batteries and an increase in noise emitted by the vehicle.  The operation became plagued by breakdowns and oftentimes the cabs were slower than the horse-drawn alternative.  The high cost of replacement batteries and tyres made the operation unprofitable and the London Electrical Cab Company reported losses of £6,200 in its first year.

The cabs were withdrawn from service and the company closed in August 1899.  The downfall of the company was said to have been caused in part by a campaign by horse-drawn cab drivers and a run of bad press caused by breakdowns and accidents.  Fully electric cabs did not return to the city's streets until the introduction of the Nissan Dynamo in October 2019.  A Bersey cab survives in the collection of London's Science Museum.

References 

Cars introduced in 1896
1890s cars
Veteran vehicles
Electric car models
Taxi vehicles
Electric vehicles introduced in the 19th century